Central is an Indian department store chain operated by Future Lifestyle Fashion of Future Group. It competes with other department store chains such as Lifestyle, Pantaloons and Max.

Outlets
Central opened its first store in Bangalore in 2004.

In January 2018, Central operated over 30 outlets in cities in India and planned to add more stores in future. New and existing stores are being upgraded to what it calls "HD format" with more premium brands and a better shopping experience.

References

External links
Future Lifestyle Fashions - Fashion Retail - Business Overview
http://www.futuregroup.in/businesses/lifestyle_fashion.html
https://centralandme.com
Central website

Buildings and structures in Bangalore
Retail companies of India
Clothing retailers of India
Future Group